State Attorney Jordan (German:Staatsanwalt Jordan) may refer to:

 State Attorney Jordan (1919 film), a German silent film
 State Attorney Jordan (1926 film), a German silent film